HD 165634 is a star in the southern constellation of Sagittarius. It has a yellow hue and is faintly visible to the naked eye with apparent visual magnitude of 4.56. The star is located at a distance of approximately 339 light years from the Sun based on parallax, but is drifting closer with a radial velocity of −5 km/s. It has an absolute magnitude of −0.53.

This is a CH-peculiar giant star with a stellar classification of G7:IIIbCN-1CH-3.5HK+1, and has been designated as a standard example of this spectral type. This notation indicates a G-type giant (G7:IIIb) with underabundances of CN and CH molecules. It is a rare "weak G–band star", showing an abnormally weak G band of the molecule CN. This indicates an underabundance of carbon in the stellar atmosphere; the abundances of most other elements are otherwise normal for a star at its evolutionary stage. The depletion of carbon is a reflection of internal processes while the star is on the red giant branch, accompanied by deep mixing.

In 2000, Böhm-Vitense and collaborators suggested that the star has an evolved white dwarf companion. This object can explain an excess flux of ultraviolet radiation, and a mass-transfer could be the source for a mild nitrogen excess on the visible component. The progenitor star was not very evolved because there is no excess of s-process elements such as barium. It may even have been a low-mass star that lost its envelope.

References

G-type giants
White dwarfs
Sagittarius (constellation)
CD-28 14174
165634
088839
6766